Saheb Ettabaâ Mosque, also known as Youssef Saheb Al Tabaa Mosque, is a mosque in Tunis, Tunisia, located in the Halfaouine area of the city. It is an official Historical Monument. It is the last great mosque built in Tunis before the establishment of French protectorate in 1881.

Structure

It bears the name of the Grand Vizier Youssef Saheb Ettabaa and was opened in 1814. Its construction lasted six years, from 1808, led by Ben Sassi and a workforce consisting primarily of slaves captured by European pirates to Tunis and made available to the Minister by Hammouda Pacha. It is influenced by Italian architecture; columns with fluted shafts, capitals and especially a unique type of veneer marble polychrome.

The mosque dominates the imposing Halfaouine district with its many domes and colonnaded galleries Italian marble work. It is part of a monumental complex built at the same time including a bazaar, a hammam, two madrasas, a sabil or public fountain, a funduq and Ettabaâ Saheb's palace (now a public library) as well as his tomb. The combination of these schedules in place of worship is a unique example in the construction of religious buildings.

The minaret is octagonal, but remained unfinished until 1970, when restoration work was finished.

References

Mosques in Tunis
Religious buildings and structures completed in 1814
19th-century mosques